Eduardo Modesto Blanco Amor (September 14, 1897 in Ourense – December 1, 1979 in Vigo) was a Galician writer and journalist who wrote in Galician and in Spanish.

Works in Galician 
 Os Nonnatos (1927)
 Romances galegos (1928)
 Poema en catro tempos (1931)
 A escadeira de Jacob 
 Cancioneiro (1956)
 A esmorga (1959). 
 Os biosbardos (1962)
 Xente ao lonxe (1972).
 Farsas para títeres (1973)
 Teatro pra xente (1974)
 Poemas galegos (1980)
 Proceso en Jacobusland (Fantasía xudicial en ningures) (1980)
 Castelao escritor (1986)
 A Contrapelo (1993)

Works in Spanish 
 Horizonte evadido (1936)
 En soledad amena (1941)
 La catedral y el niño (1948)
 Chile a la vista (1950)
 Las buenas maneras (1963)
 Los miedos (1963)

Sources 
 Allegue, G. (1993). Eduardo Blanco Amor. Diante dun xuíz ausente. Vigo: Nigra. .
 Álvarez, V. (2004). "Manuel Azaña e Eduardo Blanco Amor. Epistolario inédito (1935-1944)". Grial (163): 57–73. ISSN 0017-4181.
 Carballo Calero, R. (1975) [1963]. Historia da literatura galega contemporánea. Galaxia. pp. 715–719. .
 Casares , Carlos (Xullo-Setembro, 1973). "Leria con Eduardo Blanco-Amor". Grial (41): 337-344. ISSN 0017-4181.
 Carro, Xavier (1993). A obra literaria de Eduardo Blanco Amor. Vigo: Galaxia. .
 Couceiro Freijomil, A. (1951–53). Diccionario bio-bibliográfico de escritores I. Bibliófilos Gallegos. p. 153-154.
 Fernández, Camilo (1995). Eduardo Blanco Amor e o teatro. Universitat de Barcelona. .
 Fernández del Riego, Francisco (1971) [1951]. Historia da literatura galega (2ª ed.). Galaxia. pp. 203–204 e 249–250.
 —————— (1992) [1990]. Diccionario de escritores en lingua galega (2ª ed.). Do Castro. pp. 50–51. .
 Forcadela, Manuel (1991). Guía de lectura de “A esmorga”. Edicións do Cumio. .
 Freixanes, V. (976). "Eduardo Blanco Amor diante do espello". Unha ducia de galegos. Galaxia. pp. 79–101. .
 Gómez, A.; Queixas, M. (2001). Historia xeral da literatura galega (1ª ed.). A Nosa Terra. pp. 292–298. .
 Landeira Yrago, José (1986). Federico García Lorca y Galicia. Ediciós do Castro. .
 Lorenzana, S. (Xaneiro-Marzo, 1980). "Perfil biobibliográfico de Eduardo Blanco Amor". Grial (67): 37-45. ISSN 0017-4181.
 Méndez Ferrín, Xosé Luis (1984). De Pondal a Novoneyra. Edicións Xerais de Galicia. p. 57. .
 Pena, X. R. (2019). Historia da literatura galega. IV. De 1936 a 1975. A «longa noite». Xerais. pp. 404–441. .
 Vilavedra, Dolores, ed. (1995). Diccionario da literatura galega. Autores I. Vigo: Galaxia. pp. 79–82. .
 Poema actual a Blanco Amor (Extra). A Nosa Terra III. 1985.
 E. Blanco Amor (1897-1979). Xunta de Galicia. 1993.
 "Blanco Amor, Eduardo Modesto". Diccionario enciclopédico galego universal 9. La Voz de Galicia. 2003-2004. p. 93. .
 "Blanco Amor, Eduardo Modesto". Dicionario biográfico de Galicia 1. Ir Indo. 2010-2011. p. 111-116.
 "Blanco Amor, Eduardo Modesto". Diciopedia do século 21 1. Do Cumio, Galaxia e do Castro. 2006. p. 324. .
 "Blanco Amor, Eduardo Modesto". Enciclopedia Galega Universal 3. Ir Indo. 1999-2002. pp. 368–370. .
 "Blanco Amor, Eduardo". Gran Enciclopedia Galega Silverio Cañada (DVD). El Progreso. 2005. .
 "Eduardo Blanco Amor". Enciclopedia Microsoft Encarta (DVD). Microsoft Corporation. 2009.

1897 births
1979 deaths
Galician poets
Spanish gay writers
Spanish LGBT journalists
Spanish LGBT poets
Gay poets
People from Ourense
Galician-language writers
Spanish male poets
20th-century Spanish poets
20th-century Spanish male writers
20th-century Spanish journalists
20th-century LGBT people